Asbarez ( "Arena") is an Armenian-American bilingual daily newspaper published in Armenian and English in Los Angeles, California, formerly by the Western USA Central Committee of the Armenian Revolutionary Federation.  As of late 2020, the newspaper is no longer affiliated with the Armenian Revolutionary Federation.

History 
The newspaper began publication in 1908 in Fresno, California.  It moved to southern California several decades later when a large Armenian-American community emerged there.  Before moving to a new headquarters in the Hollywood neighborhood of Los Angeles in the 1970s, the newspaper's headquarters was located in Glendale, California, a suburb of Los Angeles.

The daily is published five times a week. It is from 16 to 28 pages, Tuesdays through Fridays and 40 to 48 pages on Saturdays. It also regularly publishes magazine supplements on special occasions.

Asbarez in English
 
The newspaper that includes both Armenian and English sections. After being an all-Armenian newspaper, a regular English section was added on May 1, 1970. The English section became a daily feature starting January 1993.

Online publication
The newspaper also went online starting 1994 and launched a web component in 1997.

Television 
Horizon Television has become a broadcasting partner.

References

External links 
 Asbarez Online

Daily newspapers published in Greater Los Angeles
Armenian-American culture in Los Angeles
Armenian-language newspapers
Newspapers established in 1908
Bilingual newspapers
1908 establishments in California